The 1969–70 Pittsburgh Penguins season was the franchise's third season in the National Hockey League. The season saw the Penguins qualify for the playoffs, for the first time in franchise history. The Penguins finished the season in second place in the West Division, 22 points behind the first place St. Louis Blues.

Offseason

Regular season
Tragedy struck the Penguins in 1970 when promising rookie center Michel Briere, who finished third in scoring on the team, was injured in a single-vehicle car crash in Quebec on May 15, 1970. His Mercury Cougar hit a frost bump and swerved off the road. It is not known if he was driving or not. Two friends who were in the vehicle with him suffered less serious injuries. After nearly spending a year in the hospital in a coma, Briere died of his head injuries. Given his junior league statistics, many hockey experts predicted that Briere would have been a star in the NHL.

Final standings

Schedule and results

|- style="background:#ffc;"
| 1 || Oct 11 || Oakland Seals || 2–2 || Pittsburgh Penguins || Civic Arena (8,230) || 0–0–1 || 1
|- style="background:#ffc;"
| 2 || Oct 15 || Philadelphia Flyers || 3–3 || Pittsburgh Penguins || Civic Arena (3,010) || 0–0–2 || 2
|- style="background:#ffc;"
| 3 || Oct 18 || Boston Bruins || 3–3 || Pittsburgh Penguins || Civic Arena (5,572) || 0–0–3 || 3
|- style="background:#fcf;"
| 4 || Oct 19 || Pittsburgh Penguins || 0–4 || Boston Bruins || Boston Garden (14,831) || 0–1–3 || 3
|- style="background:#fcf;"
| 5 || Oct 21 || Pittsburgh Penguins || 3–4 || Oakland Seals || Oakland Coliseum Arena (2,812) || 0–2–3 || 3
|- style="background:#fcf;"
| 6 || Oct 22 || Pittsburgh Penguins || 0–2 || Los Angeles Kings || The Forum (5,558) || 0–3–3 || 3
|- style="background:#cfc;"
| 7 || Oct 25 || Pittsburgh Penguins || 4–1 || Minnesota North Stars || Met Center (14,877) || 1–3–3 || 5
|- style="background:#fcf;"
| 8 || Oct 29 || New York Rangers || 3–1 || Pittsburgh Penguins || Civic Arena (4,081) || 1–4–3 || 5
|-

|- style="background:#cfc;"
| 9 || Nov 1 || Minnesota North Stars || 3–6 || Pittsburgh Penguins || Civic Arena (5,595) || 2–4–3 || 7
|- style="background:#fcf;"
| 10 || Nov 2 || Pittsburgh Penguins || 3–4 || Detroit Red Wings || Olympia Stadium (12,787) || 2–5–3 || 7
|- style="background:#fcf;"
| 11 || Nov 5 || Detroit Red Wings || 4–2 || Pittsburgh Penguins || Civic Arena (-) || 2–6–3 || 7
|- style="background:#fcf;"
| 12 || Nov 8 || Chicago Black Hawks || 4–1 || Pittsburgh Penguins || Civic Arena (6,727) || 2–7–3 || 7
|- style="background:#cfc;"
| 13 || Nov 12 || Pittsburgh Penguins || 3–0 || Toronto Maple Leafs || Maple Leaf Gardens (16,320) || 3–7–3 || 9
|- style="background:#fcf;"
| 14 || Nov 13 || Pittsburgh Penguins || 0–4 || St. Louis Blues || St. Louis Arena (15,995) || 3–8–3 || 9
|- style="background:#cfc;"
| 15 || Nov 15 || Los Angeles Kings || 1–3 || Pittsburgh Penguins || Civic Arena (4,855) || 4–8–3 || 11
|- style="background:#fcf;"
| 16 || Nov 19 || St. Louis Blues || 4–0 || Pittsburgh Penguins || Civic Arena (4,297) || 4–9–3 || 11
|- style="background:#cfc;"
| 17 || Nov 22 || Philadelphia Flyers || 3–5 || Pittsburgh Penguins || Civic Arena (5,464) || 5–9–3 || 13
|- style="background:#fcf;"
| 18 || Nov 23 || Pittsburgh Penguins || 2–3 || Chicago Black Hawks || Chicago Stadium (16,666) || 5–10–3 || 13
|- style="background:#ffc;"
| 19 || Nov 26 || Pittsburgh Penguins || 4–4 || Minnesota North Stars || Met Center (14,159) || 5–10–4 || 14
|- style="background:#cfc;"
| 20 || Nov 29 || Oakland Seals || 3–5 || Pittsburgh Penguins || Civic Arena (6,765) || 6–10–4 || 16
|- style="background:#ffc;"
| 21 || Nov 30 || Pittsburgh Penguins || 3–3 || Philadelphia Flyers || The Spectrum (13,058) || 6–10–5 || 17
|-

|- style="background:#cfc;"
| 22 || Dec 3 || Detroit Red Wings || 1–2 || Pittsburgh Penguins || Civic Arena (4,116) || 7–10–5 || 19
|- style="background:#fcf;"
| 23 || Dec 6 || Pittsburgh Penguins || 0–5 || Toronto Maple Leafs || Maple Leaf Gardens (16,449) || 7–11–5 || 19
|- style="background:#cfc;"
| 24 || Dec 7 || Toronto Maple Leafs || 2–3 || Pittsburgh Penguins || Civic Arena (7,310) || 8–11–5 || 21
|- style="background:#cfc;"
| 25 || Dec 10 || Pittsburgh Penguins || 2–0 || Los Angeles Kings || The Forum (5,366) || 9–11–5 || 23
|- style="background:#fcf;"
| 26 || Dec 12 || Pittsburgh Penguins || 1–4 || Oakland Seals || Oakland Coliseum Arena (4,760) || 9–12–5 || 23
|- style="background:#fcf;"
| 27 || Dec 14 || Pittsburgh Penguins || 1–2 || Boston Bruins || Boston Garden (14,831) || 9–13–5 || 23
|- style="background:#fcf;"
| 28 || Dec 17 || Montreal Canadiens || 5–2 || Pittsburgh Penguins || Civic Arena (6,381) || 9–14–5 || 23
|- style="background:#fcf;"
| 29 || Dec 20 || Boston Bruins || 6–4 || Pittsburgh Penguins || Civic Arena (7,858) || 9–15–5 || 23
|- style="background:#fcf;"
| 30 || Dec 21 || Pittsburgh Penguins || 0–4 || Philadelphia Flyers || The Spectrum (12,423) || 9–16–5 || 23
|- style="background:#cfc;"
| 31 || Dec 26 || Pittsburgh Penguins || 3–2 || New York Rangers || Madison Square Garden (IV) (17,250) || 10–16–5 || 25
|- style="background:#fcf;"
| 32 || Dec 27 || Chicago Black Hawks || 3–0 || Pittsburgh Penguins || Civic Arena (8,746) || 10–17–5 || 25
|- style="background:#cfc;"
| 33 || Dec 31 || Montreal Canadiens || 2–4 || Pittsburgh Penguins || Civic Arena (5,202) || 11–17–5 || 27
|-

|- style="background:#fcf;"
| 34 || Jan 3 || Pittsburgh Penguins || 0–6 || St. Louis Blues || St. Louis Arena (16,566) || 11–18–5 || 27
|- style="background:#ffc;"
| 35 || Jan 4 || Toronto Maple Leafs || 4–4 || Pittsburgh Penguins || Civic Arena (7,966) || 11–18–6 || 28
|- style="background:#fcf;"
| 36 || Jan 7 || New York Rangers || 5–3 || Pittsburgh Penguins || Civic Arena (4,671) || 11–19–6 || 28
|- style="background:#fcf;"
| 37 || Jan 8 || Pittsburgh Penguins || 1–3 || Montreal Canadiens || Montreal Forum (16,006) || 11–20–6 || 28
|- style="background:#fcf;"
| 38 || Jan 10 || Detroit Red Wings || 5–3 || Pittsburgh Penguins || Civic Arena (9,471) || 11–21–6 || 28
|- style="background:#fcf;"
| 39 || Jan 14 || Pittsburgh Penguins || 0–5 || Chicago Black Hawks || Chicago Stadium (16,666) || 11–22–6 || 28
|- style="background:#fcf;"
| 40 || Jan 17 || Pittsburgh Penguins || 0–4 || Toronto Maple Leafs || Maple Leaf Gardens (16,471) || 11–23–6 || 28
|- style="background:#cfc;"
| 41 || Jan 18 || Pittsburgh Penguins || 6–4 || Philadelphia Flyers || The Spectrum (16,666) || 12–23–6 || 30
|- style="background:#ffc;"
| 42 || Jan 21 || Oakland Seals || 3–3 || Pittsburgh Penguins || Civic Arena (3,443) || 12–23–7 || 31
|- style="background:#cfc;"
| 43 || Jan 24 || Los Angeles Kings || 2–4 || Pittsburgh Penguins || Civic Arena (7,581) || 13–23–7 || 33
|- style="background:#fcf;"
| 44 || Jan 25 || Pittsburgh Penguins || 1–3 || Boston Bruins || Boston Garden (14,835) || 13–24–7 || 33
|- style="background:#ffc;"
| 45 || Jan 28 || Toronto Maple Leafs || 4–4 || Pittsburgh Penguins || Civic Arena (4,290) || 13–24–8 || 34
|- style="background:#cfc;"
| 46 || Jan 31 || St. Louis Blues || 1–2 || Pittsburgh Penguins || Civic Arena (9,679) || 14–24–8 || 36
|-

|- style="background:#fcf;"
| 47 || Feb 1 || Pittsburgh Penguins || 0–6 || New York Rangers || Madison Square Garden (IV) (17,250) || 14–25–8 || 36
|- style="background:#cfc;"
| 48 || Feb 4 || Pittsburgh Penguins || 7–5 || Minnesota North Stars || Met Center (11,973) || 15–25–8 || 38
|- style="background:#cfc;"
| 49 || Feb 7 || Los Angeles Kings || 1–3 || Pittsburgh Penguins || Civic Arena (7,983) || 16–25–8 || 40
|- style="background:#cfc;"
| 50 || Feb 8 || Minnesota North Stars || 3–6 || Pittsburgh Penguins || Civic Arena (7,954) || 17–25–8 || 42
|- style="background:#fcf;"
| 51 || Feb 11 || Pittsburgh Penguins || 1–7 || Chicago Black Hawks || Chicago Stadium (16,666) || 17–26–8 || 42
|- style="background:#fcf;"
| 52 || Feb 14 || Boston Bruins || 3–0 || Pittsburgh Penguins || Civic Arena (12,202) || 17–27–8 || 42
|- style="background:#cfc;"
| 53 || Feb 15 || Pittsburgh Penguins || 4–2 || Detroit Red Wings || Olympia Stadium (14,487) || 18–27–8 || 44
|- style="background:#cfc;"
| 54 || Feb 17 || Philadelphia Flyers || 2–4 || Pittsburgh Penguins || Civic Arena (7,494) || 19–27–8 || 46
|- style="background:#cfc;"
| 55 || Feb 19 || Pittsburgh Penguins || 6–1 || Los Angeles Kings || The Forum (5,298) || 20–27–8 || 48
|- style="background:#fcf;"
| 56 || Feb 21 || Pittsburgh Penguins || 3–6 || Oakland Seals || Oakland Coliseum Arena (6,135) || 20–28–8 || 48
|- style="background:#fcf;"
| 57 || Feb 25 || Pittsburgh Penguins || 2–3 || Montreal Canadiens || Montreal Forum (16,259) || 20–29–8 || 48
|- style="background:#cfc;"
| 58 || Feb 26 || Los Angeles Kings || 0–1 || Pittsburgh Penguins || Civic Arena (4,826) || 21–29–8 || 50
|- style="background:#cfc;"
| 59 || Feb 28 || Oakland Seals || 2–3 || Pittsburgh Penguins || Civic Arena (10,740) || 22–29–8 || 52
|-

|- style="background:#cfc;"
| 60 || Mar 4 || Montreal Canadiens || 1–2 || Pittsburgh Penguins || Civic Arena (8,047) || 23–29–8 || 54
|- style="background:#fcf;"
| 61 || Mar 5 || Pittsburgh Penguins || 3–5 || Detroit Red Wings || Olympia Stadium (14,411) || 23–30–8 || 54
|- style="background:#ffc;"
| 62 || Mar 7 || St. Louis Blues || 2–2 || Pittsburgh Penguins || Civic Arena (12,881) || 23–30–9 || 55
|- style="background:#ffc;"
| 63 || Mar 8 || Pittsburgh Penguins || 0–0 || New York Rangers || Madison Square Garden (IV) (17,250) || 23–30–10 || 56
|- style="background:#ffc;"
| 64 || Mar 11 || Pittsburgh Penguins || 2–2 || Oakland Seals || Oakland Coliseum Arena (3,775) || 23–30–11 || 57
|- style="background:#fcf;"
| 65 || Mar 12 || Pittsburgh Penguins || 1–4 || Los Angeles Kings || The Forum (6,027) || 23–31–11 || 57
|- style="background:#fcf;"
| 66 || Mar 14 || Pittsburgh Penguins || 3–6 || Minnesota North Stars || Met Center (14,833) || 23–32–11 || 57
|- style="background:#fcf;"
| 67 || Mar 18 || New York Rangers || 2–0 || Pittsburgh Penguins || Civic Arena (7,551) || 23–33–11 || 57
|- style="background:#fcf;"
| 68 || Mar 19 || Pittsburgh Penguins || 1–3 || St. Louis Blues || St. Louis Arena (16,336) || 23–34–11 || 57
|- style="background:#fcf;"
| 69 || Mar 21 || Chicago Black Hawks || 5–3 || Pittsburgh Penguins || Civic Arena (12,103) || 23–35–11 || 57
|- style="background:#fcf;"
| 70 || Mar 22 || Pittsburgh Penguins || 4–5 || Montreal Canadiens || Montreal Forum (18,454) || 23–36–11 || 57
|- style="background:#cfc;"
| 71 || Mar 25 || Minnesota North Stars || 0–2 || Pittsburgh Penguins || Civic Arena (6,017) || 24–36–11 || 59
|- style="background:#cfc;"
| 72 || Mar 28 || Pittsburgh Penguins || 2–1 || Philadelphia Flyers || The Spectrum (14,606) || 25–36–11 || 61
|- style="background:#ffc;"
| 73 || Mar 29 || St. Louis Blues || 5–5 || Pittsburgh Penguins || Civic Arena (7,887) || 25–36–12 || 62
|-

|- style="background:#cfc;"
| 74 || Apr 1 || Philadelphia Flyers || 1–4 || Pittsburgh Penguins || Civic Arena (7,984) || 26–36–12 || 64
|- style="background:#fcf;"
| 75 || Apr 4 || Pittsburgh Penguins || 1–3 || St. Louis Blues || St. Louis Arena (17,017) || 26–37–12 || 64
|- style="background:#fcf;"
| 76 || Apr 5 || Minnesota North Stars || 5–1 || Pittsburgh Penguins || Civic Arena (6,991) || 26–38–12 || 64
|-

|- style="text-align:center;"
| Legend:       = Win       = Loss       = Tie

Playoffs
The Penguins would reach the playoffs for the first time in 1970, advancing to the Western Conference Finals where they lost to the St. Louis Blues. In the Pittsburgh-Oakland series, in game one, Nick Harbaruk's goal midway through the third period was the winner as Pittsburgh won 2–1. In game two,
Gary Jarrett gave Oakland a 1–0 lead, but Pittsburgh came back to win 3–1. Game three at Oakland featured a hat trick by Ken Schinkel of the Penguins as Pittsburgh won 5–2. Game four featured Oakland having 1–0 and 2–1 leads,
but the Seals just couldn't hold on and the game was tied 2–2 at the end of regulation time. Overtime was necessary and Michel Briere scored the series winning goal at 8:28 of overtime for Pittsburgh. In the West Division finals, the St. Louis Blues beat the Pittsburgh Penguins
in six games.

|- bgcolor="#cfc"
| 1 || April 8 || Oakland || 1–2 || Pittsburgh || 1–0
|- bgcolor="#cfc"
| 2 || April 9 || Oakland || 1–3 || Pittsburgh || 2–0 
|- bgcolor="#cfc"
| 3 || April 11 || Pittsburgh || 5–2 || Oakland || 3–0
|- bgcolor="#cfc"
| 4 || April 12 || Pittsburgh || 3–2 OT || Oakland || 4–0 
|-

|- bgcolor="#fcf"
| 1 || April 19 || Pittsburgh || 1–3 || St. Louis || 0–1
|- bgcolor="#fcf"
| 2 || April 21 || Pittsburgh || 1–4 || St. Louis || 0–2
|- bgcolor="#cfc"
| 3 || April 23 || St. Louis || 2–3 || Pittsburgh || 1–2
|- bgcolor="#cfc"
| 4 || April 26 || St. Louis || 1–2  || Pittsburgh || 2–2
|- bgcolor="#fcf"
| 5 || April 28 || Pittsburgh || 0–5 || St. Louis || 2–3
|- bgcolor="#fcf"
| 6 || April 30 || St. Louis || 4–3 || Pittsburgh || 2–4
|-

|- style="text-align:center;"
| Legend:       = Win       = Loss

Player statistics
Skaters

Goaltenders

†Denotes player spent time with another team before joining the Penguins.  Stats reflect time with the Penguins only.
‡Denotes player was traded mid-season.  Stats reflect time with the Penguins only.

Awards and records
Ken Schinkel became the first player to score 100 points for the Penguins. He did so by scoring a goal in a 2–3 loss to Chicago on November 23.
Keith McCreary became the first player to score 50 goals for the Penguins. He did so with the first of his two goals in a 4–4 tie with Toronto on January 28.
Bryan Watson became the first player to earn 100 penalty minutes in one season for the Penguins. He did so by receiving 26 PIMs in a 1–7 loss to Chicago on February 11.
Ken Schinkel became the first to play 200 games for the Penguins. He did so in a 0–2 loss to New York on March 18.
Michel Brière established a rookie record for the Penguins in terms of assists (32) and points (44).

Transactions
The Penguins were involved in the following transactions during the 1969–70 season:

Trades

Additions and subtractions

Draft picks

Pittsburgh Penguins' picks at the 1969 NHL Entry Draft. 

Draft notes 
 The Pittsburgh Penguins' first-round pick went to the Boston Bruins as the result of a May 21, 1968, trade that sent Jean Pronovost and John Arbour to the Penguins in exchange for this pick.
 The Pittsburgh Penguins' seventh-round pick went to the St. Louis Blues as the result of a June 12, 1969, trade that sent cash options to the Penguins in exchange for this pick.
 The Pittsburgh Penguins' eighth-round pick went to the Montreal Canadiens as the result of a June 12, 1969, trade that sent cash options to the Penguins in exchange for this pick.

References

Pittsburgh Penguins seasons
Pittsburgh
Pittsburgh
Pitts
Pitts